Radočaj Brodski  is a village in Croatia.

Populated places in Primorje-Gorski Kotar County